The Drainage and Improvement of Lands Amendment Act (Ireland) 1872 was an act of the Parliament of the United Kingdom of Great Britain and Ireland.

The act was repealed in the United Kingdom by the Erne Drainage and Development Act (Northern Ireland) 1950, an act of the Parliament of Northern Ireland.

The act was retained for the Republic of Ireland by section 2 of, and the first schedule to the Statute Law Revision Act 2007 (Number 28 of 2007) but was later repealed by sections 2 and 8 of, and the second schedule to the Land and Conveyancing Law Reform Act 2009 (Number 27 of 2009).

References

United Kingdom Acts of Parliament 1872